Space Patrol is a British science-fiction television series featuring marionettes that was produced in 1962 and broadcast from the beginning of April 1963. It was written and produced by Roberta Leigh in association with ABC Weekend TV.

Summary
The series features the vocal talents of Dick Vosburgh, Ronnie Stevens, Libby Morris, Murray Kash and Ysanne Churchman, and comprises 39 half-hour episodes. This series is also known by its US title Planet Patrol to avoid confusion with the 1950s American live-action series of the same name. The marionettes used in the series incorporated some elements of Gerry Anderson's Supermarionation technique – specifically their mouths would move in synch with dialogue; Leigh had previously worked with Anderson on the series The Adventures of Twizzle and first season of Torchy the Battery Boy, though Anderson would not develop Supermarionation until after his association with Leigh ended.

The series is set in the year 2100, by which time the indigenous and autonomous civilizations on Earth, Mars and Venus have banded together to form the United Galactic Organization (UGO). Space Patrol is the UGO's military wing, and the series follows the actions of this interplanetary force, focusing on the missions of a tiny unit led by the heroic, bearded Captain Larry Dart. The humanoids in his crew consist of the elfin Slim from Venus, and the stocky, ravenously sausage-mad Husky from the Red Planet, Mars. The imperfect Slavic accent variants and six-pointed star chest emblems of these two may have been a sly nod to the Jewish-Russian heritage of the English series creator/writer. These men would regularly use one of two interplanetary space vehicles, the Galasphere 347 and the Galasphere 024.

Providing technical support on Earth is the brilliant and inventive Irishman Professor Aloysius O’Brien O’Rourke Haggarty, called "Pop" by his daughter Cassiopeia, to his perpetual dismay. Haggarty's garrulous pet Martian "parrot" (a Gabblerdictum bird), taught to talk in "The Slaves of Neptune" episode, accompanies the crew on rare occasions. Keeping them all on a tight rein are Colonel Raeburn and his super-efficient Venusian secretary, Marla, both also based on Earth.

The show reflected sex roles characteristic of the culture and era which produced it, but blonde and brainy Marla would often explicitly point out that "There are no dumb blondes on Venus." Indeed, the series was created and written by the prolific polymath artist Roberta Leigh, the first woman producer in Britain to have her own film company.

The series was sold overseas and broadcast in the US, Canada and Australia, and in spite of the very low budget – which meant that sometimes the shadow of a puppet could be seen behind a "TV Screen" before the communication device was supposedly turned on —the show rated strongly with young audiences in many regions (including New York City) and garnered a huge following. Babylon 5 creator J. Michael Straczynski said that it was his favourite TV show as a child.

The science
Whereas Gerry Anderson had a rocket ship in Fireball XL5 that could travel light years to planets around other stars as though they were just a few million miles away, Space Patrol took a more realistic approach. Because of limited speed, trips to other planets in our solar system could take weeks or months and this was facilitated by the crew of the Galasphere going into a freezer chamber and being put in suspended animation for the trip. A robot would then take over (its movements were said to cost £2,000 a time rather than being just a puppet.) The  ray (faster than light) could be used from Earth to wake them up in an emergency. The term "galaxy" was used inaccurately, but consistently, to refer to a solar system in the series, so "Galactic Control" only supervised the local planets and "other galaxies" referred to nearby star-systems.

On other planets, they would use dial-selector translators (dial P for Pluto) to talk to alien beings – at the time, even some serious scientists considered the possibility of life on Venus, Mars and maybe elsewhere. Unusually for a TV show, the translators didn't instantly pick up new languages; they had to be programmed on Earth before they could be used, a lengthy process requiring recordings of the alien language. Life support in hazardous atmospheres was provided by a "Mo-lung" (short for 'Mobile Lung')- a sealed cylindrical transparent helmet, and the crew would often ride around on "Hover Jets", or more rarely, an "Ion Gun" which looked like a giant sparkler firework. Neptune was said to have atomic heating but none of the planets were really cold, such as when Dart walked about on Pluto (in "The Buried Spaceship") without any extra protection in what would be temperatures of about −230 °C.

The Galasphere had a top speed of about 800,000 mph, using "meson power". In "The Talking Bell" episode, they use "Boost Speed", which is dangerous, but allows them to travel at almost one million miles per hour for a long period. Meson power is dangerous to use in atmosphere. The engine also used gamma rays and 'Yobba rays'. The Galasphere has a force field which would protect it from enemy missiles, and it also turned out to protect them from the mind control of the evil Neptunians who were thousands of years ahead of Earth people, with great mental powers, and who hated work.

The Galasphere was constructed of Plutonite from Pluto, and a number of times, like in "The Human Fish", it also travelled underwater. Pluto was the furthest they normally travelled but after an accident they went way beyond that to a self-heated new planet which was full of giants who treated the Galasphere as a toy. Another time, an alien from Alpha Centauri visited them and installed a device which allowed the Galasphere to travel faster than light (at which point it vanished). They had their adventure twenty five trillion miles away and then returned to Earth, and just made it, with Galasphere 347 collapsing under the strain of such travel, just as they left it. In "The Planet of Light", Dart and Slim were taken to a planet circling Sirius (8.7 light years away) in just a few hours. This fast journey was necessary as the "light beings" who took them would be poisoned by air, so the two had to rely on their own supplies.

In "The Rings of Saturn" and a minority of other episodes, the crew rode the Galasphere 024, rather than the Galasphere 347. The references to Galasphere 024 are, for the most part, continuity errors introduced by the continual re-use of stock footage from the pilot episode, "The Swamps of Jupiter". Although the Galasphere is referred to as 024 during the takeoff programme sequence, it is often later referred to as 347 in the same episode.

Production
The series was filmed in converted church buildings in Stoke Newington and Harlesden, London. The production was completed in two blocks consisting of 26 and 13 episodes, which are considered as the first series. The final 13 episodes employ refurbished puppets and sets, and are copyrighted 1962 Wonderama Productions on the end credits (the first 26 episodes omitted any on-screen copyright information).

Various puppets from the series were re-used in later Roberta Leigh productions including Wonderboy and Tiger and Send for Dithers. These colour films reveal the fact that the Gabblerdictum was bright pink. Other than two endpapers from the TV Comic Annual for 1966, no colour photographic materials from the series have survived. These images indicate that the puppets were dressed in monochromatic uniforms, although most comic strip and book illustrations depict them as red and silver. Slim's darker complexion in the series suggests that the Venusians and Martians were repainted in their 'correct' skin tone for this batch of episodes, although no colour stills from the second series are known to exist.

Leigh had previously worked with Gerry Anderson on children's puppet series, and there are some obvious similarities between Space Patrol and Anderson's Fireball XL5, although Space Patrol was made on a lower budget. Arthur Provis, Anderson's former business partner in AP Films was responsible for the cinematography. For many years it was believed that all but a handful of episodes had been destroyed, until a complete cache of 16 mm prints was discovered in the garage of Roberta Leigh's home. Despite their scratched and grainy condition, they were of sufficient historic interest to warrant a commercial release, initially on VHS tapes, and later on DVD. Two episodes have survived from the original 35 mm prints and these were later made available on Blu-ray Disc.

Style of the series
Although compared (and often confused) with the Gerry Anderson productions (due to the similar use of voice-synchronised marionettes), Space Patrol is distinguished by some of its creative choices. The only music involved is avant-garde, the theme being made by Roberta Leigh herself using electronic equipment she bought from a local store after asking an assistant for anything that made interesting noises. F. C. Judd was responsible for creating all the electronic music for the series; he was an early British electronic experimenter, amateur radio expert, circuit designer, author and contributor to many wireless and electronics magazines from the 1950s to the 1990s.

In addition, the marionettes used for Space Patrol were more realistic-looking and less cartoon-like than those being used on Fireball XL5; in terms of relative realism, the puppets of Space Patrol fall between that of Thunderbirds and Captain Scarlet and the Mysterons. There were two types of robots, and the ones with the thick upper bodies were mainly used.

Final credits always showed panoramic views over a gigantic city of the future, and never featured any music; only the throb of some industrial machinery, sounding like a gigantic pump or a steam engine beating rhythmically. The male characters from the planet Venus (Slim for example) had obvious androgynous features (in contrast to the more rustic and virile Martians).

Episodes
There are 39 episodes across one series.

Series One
 "The Swamps of Jupiter" – Captain Dart and his crew are sent to investigate the loss of contact with a scientific base on Jupiter and encounter Martian fur trappers who are killing the local Loomi creatures for their heat-retaining skins. (DVD Disc 1)
 "The Wandering Asteroid" – The Space Patrol crew accept a dangerous mission to destroy an asteroid deflected from its orbit by a cometary collision and heading directly for the Martian capital of Wotan. Many have noted the extraordinary similarities between this episode and the Bruce Willis vehicle Armageddon. (DVD Disc 1)
 "The Dark Planet" – Professor Haggerty and his daughter Cassiopeia are baffled by a plant sample from Uranus with a mind of its own! Following the disappearance of a 20-strong survey team on Uranus, Colonel Raeburn dispatches the Space Patrol crew to locate larger versions of the plant, where they discover the adult specimens of the plant are far from friendly. (DVD Disc 1)
 "The Slaves of Neptune" – The crew of the Galasphere are sent to solve the mystery of a spaceship sending colonists to Pluto which disappeared near Neptune. On approach to Neptune, Dart, Slim and Husky fall under the hypnotic influence of Neptunian overlord Tyro who is using his powers to trap Earth colonists as slaves. (DVD Disc 1)
 "The Fires of Mercury" – Professor Haggerty's device for translating the language of ants also converts heat waves into radio waves. Marla realises that this might provide a way of transmitting warmth from Mercury to the Colony on Pluto, where freezing conditions worsen as the planet nears the point in its orbit farthest from the Sun. (DVD Disc 3)
 "The Shrinking Spaceman" – When the Galasphere crew are sent to repair the sonar beam transmitter on the asteroid Pallas, Husky succumbs to a mysterious shrinking disease after cutting his hand on a rock. Keeping him in suspended animation, Professor Haggerty attempts to find a cure. (DVD Disc 1)
 "The Robot Revolution" – When an undersea eruption at the Atlantic sea farm damages robot workers, Space Headquarters is overrun by the rampaging machines, determined to seize control of the city. (DVD Disc 2)
 "The Cloud of Death" – A cloud of metallic particles plunges the Earth into darkness. The work of Neptunian leader Tyro, he threatens to freeze the Earth unless Raeburn agrees to send human slaves to work for the Neptunians. (DVD Disc 4)
 "The Rings of Saturn" – Observing Saturn, Dart and his crew notice a meteor shadowing the Galasphere. On discovering it is actually a Saturnian spacecraft, Dart makes contact and brings a tape of Saturnian language back to Earth for decoding. When contact is finally made with the planet, it transpires that Dart has inadvertently offended the Saturnian by picking leaves of their sacred tree. (DVD Disc 2)
 "Volcanoes of Venus" – A virus is paralysing areas of Venus. Raeburn learns that Slim's uncle Gallia intends to seize power by releasing into the air a powder that causes the paralysis. Slim is sent to Venus to investigate, but contacts Space Headquarters to announce that he has changed allegiance and will assist his uncle...back to his mother ship. (DVD Disc 4)
 "Mystery on the Moon" – From a base on the Moon, Berridge threatens Space Headquarters with destruction by laser beam unless Raeburn agrees to send him a freighter full of gold. Dart is sent to Moon Station One to investigate and discovers an artificial crater. (DVD Disc 2)
 "The Miracle Tree of Saturn" – A fungus is destroying crops at an alarming rate. By chance Professor Haggarty discovers a cutting from the Saturnian's sacred tree on Raeburn's desk destroys the fungus and Dart is dispatched to Saturn to obtain further supplies. However, their plan has been overheard by an unscrupulous technician. (DVD Disc 4)
 "The Forgers" – Colonel Raeburn is baffled by a sudden influx of forged currency while Dart and his crew take it upon themselves to investigate what appears to be a disease killing the vegetation on Mars. Dart and Husky stumble across the source of the forgeries... (DVD Disc 1)
 "The Planet of Thought" – Tyro has come to Earth with a view to joining the UGO but is sidetracked when he catches sight of Marla. Using his hypnotic powers, Tyro returns to Neptune with Marla where he makes her his princess. Dart follows them to discover a way to break the spell.(DVD Disc 4)
 "The Glowing Eggs of Titan" – Husky's discovery of a luminous egg on the Saturnian moon of Titan could prove to be the solution to the Martian energy crisis. While Dart and his crew are on an egg-gathering mission, Slim falls and damages his air line. As he waits to be rescued he hears a strange humming... (DVD Disc 2)
 "The Planet of Light" – Dart and Slim are invited to the planet of Lumen. On their arrival Dart's oxygen cylinder is pierced. The planet's only oxygen comes from blister plants in the "cave of death". Dart and Slim must find the plants before dawn, or risk being boiled alive in the heat of the Sun...(DVD Disc 4)
 "Time Stands Still" – Stolen art treasures are being transported into space. Raeburn suspects that Venusian millionaire Tara is behind the thefts, but his palace is too well guarded. Professor Haggarty develops a watch that speeds up the wearer's reaction times by a factor of sixty, which enables Dart to sneak into the palace unnoticed. (DVD Disc 3)
 "Husky Becomes Invisible" – When Dart is sent to Mars to find the eggs of the Aba bird to help find a cure for a condition known as the "floats", he calls on Professor Zeller who has discovered that his new star-measuring apparatus can make objects disappear. (DVD Disc 2)
 "The Walking Lake of Jupiter" – Scientists Dr. Brown and Dr. Smith discover that water from a Jovian lake has the power to cause inanimate objects to move as if with a life of their own. Dart arrives to witness the phenomenon and ends up on the trail of the unfortunate Dr. Brown, whose spacesuit has become energised by the Jovian water. (DVD Disc 2)
 "The New Planet" – Galasphere 347 is in deep space. After a comet collides with the ship, Dart and his crew discover a new planet beyond the orbit of Pluto. Touching down in the dense forest, Dart and Slim meet one of the planet's giant inhabitants. (DVD Disc 3)
 "The Human Fish" – The Tula Fish in the Venusian Magda Ocean are evolving at an extraordinary rate and attack fishermen. The Galasphere crew are sent to help and discover that routinely dumped building materials may be the cause of the Tula's accelerated evolution. (DVD Disc 3)
 "The Invisible Invasion" – On Uranus, the Duos are planning to seize power on Earth by taking over the minds of everyone at Space Headquarters, including Colonel Raeburn. The one person seemingly unaffected by the Duos' power is Professor Haggarty, who is installed beneath his electronic hair-restorer! (DVD Disc 3)
 "The Talking Bell" – On a hunting trip, Raeburn and Haggarty encounter a soft, bell-shaped object with a single extensible leg. It is a visitor from another planet, but Raeburn has accidentally shot its space vehicle down with his 12-bore! Dart is assigned to return "Mr. Bell" to his mother ship. (DVD Disc 4)
 "The Buried Spaceship" – "Operation Ice Cube" is put into action when Marla suggests moving ice through space as a solution to a drought problem on Mars. Galasphere 347 is sent to assist but develops a fault in the Meson Power Unit forcing the craft to land for repairs... (DVD Disc 2)
 "Message from a Star" – Signals from Alpha Centauri suggest intelligent life but it would take a Galasphere 3,000 years to cross the immense distance. Irya, a being from the planet Delta, teleports himself to Earth to fit a special power unit to the Galasphere, enabling it to travel at faster-than-light speeds. Professor Haggarty, however, has reservations about making the trip. (DVD Disc 3)
 "Explosion on the Sun" – An explosion on the surface of Sun causes a temperature rise on Earth and Venus. The Venusian president is contacted by Dr. Duncan, who has been causing the explosions by firing a freighter of beryllium into the Sun. He threatens to release further charges unless Earth and Venus send weapons and robots to Ganymede. (DVD Disc 4)
 "The Unknown Asteroid" – The problem of dwindling supplies of Plutonite is solved when an asteroid made of the material is discovered. But before Raeburn has managed to secure the asteroid Miga, a wealthy Venusian has taken possession and intends to sell it. Raeburn reluctantly agrees to the asking price and sends Dart to complete the transaction. (DVD Disc 5)
 "The Evil Eye of Venus" – Professor Borra of Venus has invented a mechanical eye which can destroy any ship constructed of metal alien to Earth, Mars or Venus. The demonstration is impressive but what will happen when a Galasphere constructed from metal mined from Pluto comes within range? (DVD Disc 5)
 "Secret Formula" – Exploring the Silver Forest of Venus, Husky becomes trapped in the web of a Spirigum Spider. Haggarty manages to free him and discovers that fragments of the web act as a truth drug. Raeburn, meanwhile, is offered the formula for Kinotine, which has the ability to store heat indefinitely. Kinotine's inventor, Dr. Mason, will donate the formula but when a call is received from Kolig, head of Mars's largest chemical plant, offering the formula for sale, Raeburn suspects foul play. (DVD Disc 5)
 "The Telepathic Robot" – Haggarty invents a robot that responds to thoughts. Dart tests the range of telepathic thought in space and investigates a new planet near the Sun unaware that the Neptunians have encamped there. Only Haggarty's new robot escapes the Neptunians' hypnotic influence. (DVD Disc 5)
 "Deadly Whirlwind" – To halt a virus destroying Martian vegetation, Dart is sent with a spray that is deadly to all forms of life except those native to Mars. When the spray comes into contact with a whirlwind, the chemical is rushed into space and is soon on a collision course with Earth.  (DVD Disc 5)
 "The Jitter Waves" – A strange jittering is affecting the city and other Earth locations. Haggarty discovers, by chance, that the jittering is caused by radio waves emitted by Uranus, where the Duos are once again planning an invasion. (DVD disc 5)
 "Sands of Death" – Tyrig plans to use a nerve gas to seize power on Mars. Raeburn discovers that Tyrig and his men have set up base on the Martian moon Phobos and Dart is sent to investigate. Dart and his crew are captured by Tyrig, who wants to use the Galasphere to spread the gas. Refusing to co-operate they are placed in a dungeon which slowly fills with sand.  (DVD Disc 5)
 "The Hairy Men of Mars" – The Galasphere's Meson unit malfunctions and lands in the unexplored Tuhera jungle. Dart and Husky leave to fix the problem. When Husky fails to return, Dart follows and is captured by a giant primitive man. Husky speaks with the giant in its native language and they are set free. They return to Earth with some Martian fruit which makes hair grow—the perfect solution to Haggarty's problem. (DVD Disc 6)
 "The Grass of Saturn" – Saturn has a new leader. Riga is succeeded by his brother Simba and whilst Dart is en route to investigate, Simba launches rockets destined for Earth containing Saturnian grass seed—which absorbs oxygen and emits carbon dioxide. (DVD Disc 6)
 "Force Field X" – The Neptunians create a forcefield around the Earth containing particles with strong electromagnetic properties. The field begins disrupting electricity supplies, causing a complete blackout. (DVD Disc 6)
 "The Water Bomb" – The Galasphere is sent on a rain-making mission to Mars with a cargo of oxygen and hydrogen—the very ingredients escaped criminal Marog requires to complete his bomb under construction at his Phobos hideaway. (DVD Disc 6)
 "Destruction by Sound" – Raeburn is contacted by Yria from Alpha Centauri who is seeking help to destroy an evil computer superbrain which is attempting to take over the planet Delta. (DVD Disc 6)
 "The Shrinking Gas of Jupiter" – On a mission to Jupiter, Slim disappears in the swamps. Raeburn orders Dart and Husky to leave but trouble with the Galasphere's primary drives gives Dart an excuse to resume the search only to find that Slim has shrunk to dwarf-like proportions.  (DVD Disc 6)

Broadcast
Space Patrol debuted on Sunday, 7 April 1963 on ABC Weekend TV, at the time the ITV contractor for England's Midlands and North. It continued to be shown in parts of the ITV network until 1970. Following these broadcasts, the series was never repeated in the UK.

In the London area, Space Patrol was shown on weekdays by Associated Rediffusion.

International
Planet Patrol was distributed in the U.S. by M & A Alexander Productions. It debuted in the U.S. on WPIX, a local New York station, on Sunday, 12 January 1964, at 5:30 p.m. It was sponsored by Drake's Cakes. The show appeared in Los Angeles in September 1964 on KHJ-TV. The show appears on the schedule of Boston's WKBG-TV in January 1967.

The series was also broadcast in Malta and Australia.

Home media

DVD
A 'best of' DVD release appeared in 2001, comprising six episodes: "The Swamps of Jupiter", "The Wandering Asteroid", "The Robot Revolution", "The Rings of Saturn," "Husky Becomes Invisible" and "Mystery on the Moon", including transfers of the two 35mm episodes and other special features.

The definitive DVD release, released in 2004, is a six-disc box set in PAL Region 0 (playable on any DVD player that can play PAL-encoded discs), containing all 39 episodes and numerous extras.

Disc 1
The Swamps of Jupiter
The Wandering Asteroid
The Dark Planet
The Slaves of Neptune
The Shrinking Spaceman
The Forgers

Disc 2
The Robot Revolution
The Rings of Saturn
Husky becomes Invisible
The Buried Spacecraft
Mystery on the Moon
The Glowing Eggs of Titan
The Walking Lake of Jupiter

Disc 3
Time Stands Still
Message from a Star
The Fires of Mercury
The Invisible Invasion
The New Planet
The Human Fish

Disc 4
The Planet of Light
The Talking Bell
The Miracle Tree of Saturn
The Cloud of Death
The Planet of Thought
Explosion on the Sun
Volcanoes of Venus

Disc 5
The Unknown Asteroid
The Evil Eye of Venus
Secret Formula
The Telepathic Robot
Deadly Whirlwind
The Jitter Waves
Sands of Death

Disc 6
The Hairy Men of Mars
The Grass of Saturn
Forcefield X
The Water Bomb
Destruction by Sound
The Shrinking Gas of Jupiter

Special Features

Discs 1–3
Sara & Hoppity Episode
Roberta Leigh interview
National Interest Pictures Brochure
The Adventures of Twizzle Episode
Arthur Provis interview
Dick Vosburgh Interview 
Mr Hero pilot

Discs 4–6
Joe-Michael Straczynski Interview
Commercial Break Bumpers
Paul Starr pilot
Andy Partridge Interview
Send for Dithers Episode (also in 3-disk set)
Wonder Boy & Tiger Episode (also in 3-disk set)
The Solarnauts pilot

Blu-ray
In March 2018, the Network imprint announced that a Region-free Blu-ray box set of the complete series, restored using the latest technology, would be released on 2 April of that year. There are no subtitles or special features.

Other media
A small number of Space Patrol episodes were made available in the Standard-8 and Super-8 home movie formats from Mountain Films during the 1960s and 70s. Episodes known to have been released in this format are: "The Swamps of Jupiter", "The Miracle Tree of Saturn", "The Robot Revolution" and "Mystery on the Moon." The films were released in 400' sound editions, and packaging for all titles used the same artwork as the first release, "Mystery on the Moon." The title Space Patrol did not appear anywhere on the packaging. The films were all around 16 minutes long, with most of the material coming from the second act of the episodes. The complete series was released by Network on VHS tape following the recovery of the episodes in the late 1990s.

Comics
A number of comic strip adaptations of Space Patrol were produced:

TV Comic: 52 double-page strips forming the centrespread of each issue, in issues 668 to 719. They were written by Roberta Leigh herself and illustrated by artist Bill Mevin, and in colour it was shown that Venusians had blue skin and Martians green.
The Beezer: from issue 558 dated 24 September 1966 to issue 583 dated 18 March 1967, illustrated by artist Terry Patrick (i.e. 26 2-page colour episodes in total).
Two Super Mag comics.
A 1965 Wonderama Productions annual with both stories by Roberta Leigh and illustrations by R. W. Smethurst. Title: Space Patrol and the Secret Weapon.

References

External links

  Space Patrol, the website (archived 29-Jun-2011) provides a comprehensive guide to the series, including screenshots, episode guide, encyclopaedia of terms, behind-the-scenes information, and links to other Space Patrol websites.

1960s British children's television series
1960s British science fiction television series
1963 British television series debuts
1963 British television series endings
Black-and-white British television shows
British children's adventure television series
British television shows featuring puppetry
English-language television shows
First-run syndicated television programs in the United States
ITV children's television shows
Marionette films
Fiction about the Solar System
Space adventure television series
Space Western television series
Television series about extraterrestrial life
Television shows produced by ABC Weekend TV
Television series set in the future
Television shows adapted into comics
Television shows shot in London